HD 183552, also known as HR 7411, is a probable spectroscopic binary located in the southern constellation Telescopium. The system has a combined apparent magnitude of 5.74, allowing it to be faintly visible to the naked eye. Based on parallax measurements from the Gaia spacecraft, it is estimated to be 337 light years distant.

This object is an Am star with a spectral classification of kA6hF2mF2 (II), an evolved F-type star having the calcium K-line of an A6 star plus the hydrogen and metallic lines of an F2 star.

References

Spectroscopic binaries
Am stars
F-type giants
Telescopium (constellation)
Telescopium, 62
183552
7411
096141
PD-53 09585